Lukanov is a surname. Notable people with the surname include:

Andrey Lukanov (1938–1996), Bulgarian politician
Dimitar Lukanov (born 1969), Bulgarian-American artist
Dmytro Lukanov (born 1995), Ukrainian footballer
Emanuel Lukanov (born 1975), Bulgarian footballer
Karlo Lukanov (1897–1982), Bulgarian politician